The Laos women's national under-18 basketball team is a national basketball team of Laos, administered by the Fédération de Basketball du Laos.

It represents the country in international under-18 (under age 18) women's basketball competitions.

See also
Laos men's national basketball team

References

External links
Laos Basketball Records at FIBA Archive

U-18
Women's national under-18 basketball teams